The 1948–49 Michigan Wolverines men's basketball team represented the University of Michigan in intercollegiate basketball during the 1948–49 season.  The team compiled a 15–6 record, and 7–5 against Big Ten Conference opponents.  The team finished in third place in the Big Ten. Ernie McCoy was in his first season as the team's head coach, and William Roberts was the team captain.

Mack Supronowicz and Bob Harrison were the team's leading scorers with 247 and 214 points, respectively.  Supronowicz's 247 points set a new Michigan single season scoring record, surpassing the previous record of 230 points set by James Mandler in the 1941–42 season.  Supronowicz also became the first player in Michigan history to score 100 field goals in a season.

Scoring statistics

Coaching staff
Ernie McCoy - head coach
Fritz Crisler - athletic director

References

Michigan
Michigan Wolverines men's basketball seasons
Michigan Wolverines basketball
Michigan Wolverines basketball